John Adam Gaskell Kennard (8 November 1884 – 6 April 1949) was an English first-class cricketer.

Kennard represented Hampshire in two first-class matches in 1919, which was the first County Championship after the First World War. Kennard made his debut against Middlesex and played his final match for the county against Surrey.

In 1922 Kennard joined Oxfordshire and represented the county in the Minor Counties Championship. Kennard made his debut against Buckinghamshire and played his final Minor Counties match in 1923 against Cambridgeshire.

Kennard died in Hove, Sussex on 6 April 1949.

External links
John Kennard at Cricinfo
John Kennard at CricketArchive

1884 births
1949 deaths
Cricketers from Chelsea, London
English cricketers
Hampshire cricketers
Oxfordshire cricketers